Oceanobacillus limi is a gram positive, rod shaped, halophilic bacteria of the family Bacillaceae. Oceanobacillus limi was isolated from a mud sample of the hypersaline lake Aran-Bidgol in Iran and also from marine sponge (Plakortic dariae) of Saint Martin's island of the Bay of Bengal, Bangladesh. The type strain of Oceanobacillus limi is strain H9BT ( = IBRC-M 10780T = KCTC 13823T = CECT 7997T). Oceanobacillus limi cannot produce indole or H2S.

References 

Bacillaceae
Gram-positive bacteria